Acronicta pasiphae is a moth of the family Noctuidae. It is found in south-eastern Turkey, Iraq, Iran and Israel.

Adults are on wing from May to September. There are probably two generations per year.

External links
The Acronictinae, Bryophilinae, Hypenodinae and Hypeninae of Israel

Acronicta
Moths of Asia
Moths described in 1936